The Palazzo Bartoli Corbini, also known as Palazzo Naldini or Pestellini is a palace located on Via Cavour #8 in central Florence, region of Tuscany Italy.

The palace was designed by the architect Bartolomeo Ammanati.

References

External links

Palaces in Florence
Palazzo Bartoli Corbini